No. 356 Squadron RAF was a short-lived long-range bomber squadron of the Royal Air Force between 1944 and 1945.

History
The squadron was formed on 15 January 1944 at Salbani, Bengal, British India, as a long-range bomber unit equipped with the Consolidated Liberator.

No.356 Squadron included many personnel from the Royal Canadian Air Force (RCAF) and Canadians serving in the RAF. The main reason for this was that the main Liberator conversion unit, under the British Commonwealth Air Training Plan,  was in Canada, at RCAF Boundary Bay, in British Columbia. 

Wing Commander Hugo Beall DSO, a Canadian serving in the RAF, was the first CO of 356 Squadron, when it started operations in 1943. Under Beall's leadership in the early raids this squadron developed techniques for low-level bombing of the dispersed and relatively small targets in Burma and Thailand. The squadron was later led by another Canadian, RCAF Wing Commander G. N. B. (Bryan) Sparks, DSO, who commanded it until 11 August 1945.

The squadron's first operations were meteorological flights, for training purposes, in June 1944. Its first bombing mission was on 27 July 1944. From then the squadron attacked Japanese bases in South East Asia and planted mines outside enemy harbours. On 15 June 1945 the squadron together with 159 Squadron destroyed the 10,000 ton Japanese tanker, Tohu Maru in the Gulf of Siam of Koh Samui Island.

In July 1945 the squadron moved to the Cocos Islands to prepare for the invasion of Malaya.

On 23 August 1945, one of its aircraft, Serial Number KL654 flown by Flight Lieutenant John Watts, crashed at Kuala Pilah, Negeri Sembilan, Malaya after parachuting Claude Fenner, later Inspector General of Malaysian Police into Malaya. The wreck was discovered in the 1950s and again in 1996 by local tribes-people. The bodies of the crew were retrieved and buried in Cheras War Cemetery, Kuala Lumpur in 2012.

The end of the war came before the invasion was carried out and the squadron performed supply-dropping and transport duties until it was disbanded on 15 November 1945.

Aircraft operated

Squadron bases

See also
List of Royal Air Force aircraft squadrons
Tiger Force (air)

References

Citations

Bibliography

External links

 No. 356 Squadron history
 Squadron histories of nos. 353–361 squadron on rafweb

356 Squadron
Military units and formations established in 1944
Bomber squadrons of the Royal Air Force in World War II
N